The X-Coupe was a concept crossover coupe designed by Chris Bangle for BMW, debuting at the 2001 North American International Auto Show in Detroit. Based upon the BMW X5 chassis, the X-Coupe featured an aluminium body and a 3.0 litre turbo-diesel engine.  Unlike the BMW X5, the X-Coupe had an aluminium body, a trunk opening downwards and two doors that swing outward.

References

X-Coupe
Cars introduced in 2001